Silhan Özçelik (born ) is a British woman of Kurdish descent from Highbury, London.

She was arrested at London Stansted Airport on 16 January 2015 on her return from Syria, suspected of travelling to that country to fight against Islamic State. She stated that she had been doing humanitarian work, and her family confirmed that she had gone there as an aid worker. She was released on bail on 18 January.

She was held in HM Prison Holloway awaiting trial, accused of travelling on Eurostar from London to Brussels on 27 October and attempting to join the Women's Protection Units, the female militia wing of the Kurdistan Workers' Party, to fight Islamic State of Iraq and the Levant. She is charged with "Engaging in conduct in preparation for giving effect to an intention to commit acts of terrorism contrary to section 5 (1) (a) of the Terrorism Act 2006."

She appeared in Westminster Magistrates' Court in March 2015 and confirmed her name, age and address. She was remanded in custody until her next appearance at the Old Bailey on 1 April.

A protest against her detention took place outside HM Prison Holloway on 13 February 2015.

Her trial began at the Old Bailey on 7 September 2015, being adjourned to 16 November 2015.

She was found guilty, and sentenced to 21 months in a young offender institution on 20 November 2015.

References

Living people
1990s births
British people of Kurdish descent
British prisoners and detainees
People convicted on terrorism charges
People from Highbury
People imprisoned on charges of terrorism
Prisoners and detainees of England and Wales